A Kaza or qadaa is a subnational entity in the Arab world.

Kaza or KAZA may also refer to:

Geography
 Kaza, Himachal Pradesh, a town in Himachal Pradesh, India
 Kaza, Guntur district, a village in Guntur district of Andhra Pradesh, India
 Kaza, Krishna district, a village in Krishna district of Andhra Pradesh, India
 Kavango–Zambezi Transfrontier Conservation Area or KAZA

Communications
 KAZA-TV, a television station in Avalon, California, United States
 KAZA (AM), a radio station in Gilroy, California, United States

Music
Kaza (rapper), French rapper
 Kaža, real name Kārlis Būmeisters, part of the Latvian musical duo Valters & Kaža

See also

Kaja (name)
 Stephanie Kaza, an American professor
 Valters & Kaža, a Latvian musical group
 Kaaza, a village in Andhra Pradesh, India